Kwon Sun-oo (born 14 January 1999) is a South Korean snowboarder. She competed in the 2018 Winter Olympics.

References

1999 births
Living people
Snowboarders at the 2018 Winter Olympics
South Korean female snowboarders
Olympic snowboarders of South Korea
Snowboarders at the 2017 Asian Winter Games
21st-century South Korean women